Leif Rune Salte (born 28 November 1966) is a Norwegian former footballer. He played in one match for the Norway national football team in 1988.

References

External links
 

1966 births
Living people
Norwegian footballers
Norway international footballers
Place of birth missing (living people)
Association footballers not categorized by position
Bryne FK players
Viking FK players